Frank and Penelope is a 2022 American romantic crime film written and directed by Sean Patrick Flanery. The film stars Caylee Cowan, Billy Budinich, Kevin Dillon, Donna D'Errico, Lin Shaye, Johnathon Schaech, and Sean Patrick Flanery. The film is a road movie that begins in the city of Austin, Texas traveling along a deserted stretch of dirt road miles from civilization. It then takes place in the ghost town of Terlingua, Texas which devolves into chaos and violence after it is discovered that the proprietor of the motel and diner, Chisos, is a psychotic, cannibal along with his sadistic family.  Frank and Penelope suddenly become immersed in a hellish nightmare, on a life and death journey, where escape is just a heart-pounding breath away.

Frank & Penelope had its world premiere at the Riviera International Film Festival in Italy on May 14, 2022. It’s also been screened as part of the Cannes Film Festival market where Fabrication Films acquired film rights. Frank & Penelope was theatrically released in the United States on June 3, 2022.

Plot 
The film opens on Frank, a down on luck man played by Billy Budinich, who has his heart broken after he catches his wife cheating on him. he has always followed the rules and now he is going to start living for himself and taking all the risks he never took before. This sends Frank him down a path to the run-down strip club, where he meets Penelope a dancer who works there. Penelope, played by Caylee Cowan, works at the run-down strip club under the management of her boss, played by Sean Patrick Flannery. The two have been running a system with the intent to steal from clients, she sees Frank as an easy mark, before falling for him, as someone who could help her escape this world. Those events kick off Frank and Penelope’s ride-or-die journey across east Texas. Their offbeat road trip eventually leads them to a sadistic cult leader named Chisos (Johnathon Schaech).

Cast

Production 
Written by John Thaddeus. Screenplay by Sean Patrick Flanery, Frank and Penelope was produced by Tom Brady, William Shockley, Allen Gilmer, Scott Dolezal, and Sean Patrick Flanery.

Filming 
Filming began on July 12, 2021, in Terlingua, Texas with locations including an abandoned mercury mine and was completed on August 11, 2021.

Release

Theatrical
The film had its world premiere at the Riviera International Film Festival in Italy on May 14, 2022. It was released in the United States on June 3, 2022 by Redbud Studios and Fabrication Films.

Home media
Frank and Penelope was released digitally and on Blu-ray and DVD on July 3, 2022.

Reception

Box office

Critical response
Chris Vognar of the Houston Chronicle criticized the film, arguing that the film has a "ugliness of spirit" that gets more severe as it continues, stating that the writing "lacks momentum", and stating that the work of the actors "barely scrapes by".

"Caylee Cowan and Billy Budinich as great in the leading roles, with Caylee Cowan showing such a calming hopeless romantic tone through every scene she is in. Johnathon Schaech brings the creepy side to his character, which only felt like the surface to someone a lot more sinister." - Darren Lucas of MovieReviews101

References

External links 
 
 
2020s American films
2020s road movies
2022 crime films
2022 films
2022 romance films
American crime films
American road movies
American romance films
Fictional couples
Romantic crime films